Ulsi Manja is an Albanian politician. , he serves as Minister of Justice in the third Rama government led by Prime Minister Edi Rama.

References

Living people
Place of birth missing (living people)
21st-century Albanian politicians
Government ministers of Albania
Justice ministers of Albania
1973 births